Holden Special Vehicles (HSV) was the officially designated performance vehicle division for Holden. Established in 1987 and based in Clayton, Victoria, the privately owned company modified Holden models such as the standard wheelbase Commodore, long wheelbase Caprice and Statesman, and commercial Ute for domestic and export sale. HSV also modified other non-Holden cars within the General Motors lineup in low volumes.

Vehicles produced by Holden Special Vehicles have generally been marketed under the HSV brand name. However, in the early years, some retailed under the Holden brand in Australia whereas most cars for export (other than in New Zealand and Singapore) retailed under different names (namely, Vauxhall and Chevrolet Special Vehicles).

History 

Holden and Tom Walkinshaw Racing – an operation owned by Scottish racing-car driver and entrepreneur Tom Walkinshaw – established Holden Special Vehicles (HSV) as a joint venture in 1987. HSV effectively replaced the Holden Dealer Team (HDT) special-vehicles operation run by Peter Brock, after Holden severed its ties with HDT in February 1987 following the Energy Polarizer and "HDT Director" controversies. 

Since 1987 HSV has built an array of modified vehicles, most of which have been based on Holden models powered by either Holden or GM sourced V8 engines.

The first car developed by HSV was the Holden VL Commodore SS Group A SV of 1988, which was badged and sold by Holden for Group A touring car racing homologation purposes. It went on to win the 1990 Bathurst 1000 race. The first car developed, badged and sold as an HSV was the SV88.

HSV began converting (re-manufacturing) the Chevrolet Camaro 2SS coupe and Chevrolet Silverado 2500HD pick-up truck from left-hand-drive to right-hand-drive to GM's factory standards in mid-2018. The vehicles were sold with a factory warranty via the existing HSV-Holden dealership network. To cope with the expansion, HSV moved into a new premises, also in Clayton, in early 2018. It boosted job numbers from 130 to 150 staff in order to cope with production ramping up.

With GM discontinuing Holden in 2021, a newly formed GM subsidiary, General Motors Specialty Vehicles (GMSV), imports and distributes the Silverado in the Australasia region beginning in November 2020. GMSV handles the distribution of key Chevrolet vehicles. Walkinshaw Group, the parent company of HSV, continues to re-manufacture the Silverado 1500 on behalf of GMSV.

Nameplates 
The following is an alphabetical listing of the most notable and popular nameplates used by HSV.

 Avalanche
The HSV Avalanche is an all-wheel drive crossover SUV that was produced from 2003 to 2005. Based on the Holden Adventra LX8 crossover wagon, the Avalanche range also incorporated a dual-cab utility model known as the Avalanche XUV, derived from the Holden Crewman Cross8. The Avalanche has been built over the following series:
 VY (2003–2005)
 VZ (2005)

 ClubSport
The HSV ClubSport or Clubsport is a full size sports sedan that has represented the brand's highest volume seller since its introduction in 1990. It was based on the mainstream Commodore range and has been the entry-level HSV model except between 1995 and 1998, when that role was filled by the Manta range. In 1999, HSV introduced a higher specification known as the "R8". The Clubsport has been built over the following series:
 VN (1990–1991)
 VP (1991–1993)
 VR (1993–1995)
 VS (1995–1997)
 VT (1997–2000)
 VX (2000–2002)
 VY (2002–2004)
 VZ (2004–2006)
 VE (2006–2013)
 VF (2013–2017)

 Coupé
The HSV Coupé is a high performance grand tourer that was produced from 2001 to 2006. It was based on the Holden Monaro, the Coupé adaptation of the third generation Holden Commodore. Its standard model range included the GTO and GTS. In 2004, the GTS was discontinued and the all-wheel drive Coupé4 introduced. Limited edition models included the GTO LE (2003 and 2006) and GTO Signature (2006). The Coupé has been built over the following series:
 VX (2001–2002)
 VX Series II (2002–2004)
 VZ (2004–2006)

 Grange
The HSV Grange is a full size luxury sedan and it was based on the luxury Holden Statesman and Caprice twins. The Grange has represented the HSV brand's most top-of-the-line, luxury offering to date. Since 1997, this nameplate has replaced both the HSV Statesman and Caprice models. The Grange has been built over the following series:
 VS (1997–1999)
 WH (1999–2003)
 VY (2003–2004)
 VZ (2004–2006)
 VE (2006–2013)
 VF (2013–2016)

 GTS
The HSV GTS is a full size high performance sedan that was based on the mainstream Commodore range. Excluding the special V6-engined editions sold in New Zealand in the VN and VP series, the proper and original V8-engined GTS was introduced in Australia in 1992 with the VP series. The GTS has represented the HSV brand's most powerful offering to date. With the exception of the Z Series, when it was not part of the range, the GTS has been built over the following series:
 In 1990, HSV built special V6-engined GTS models for New Zealand in the VN and VP series.
 VP (1991–1993)
 VR (1993–1995)
 VS (1995–1997)
 VT (1997–2000)
 VX (2000–2002)
 VY (2002–2004)
 VE (2006–2013)
 VF (2013–2017)

 Maloo
The HSV Maloo is a performance utility that has been produced since 1990 and was based on the Holden Ute. Its distinguishing features have been high-performance V8 engines and full body kits. The name "Maloo" means "thunder" in an Aboriginal language. It is said that former HSV managing director, John Crennan, coined the name for the vehicle after reading a book on Aboriginal Australians.

In 2001, HSV introduced a higher "R8" specification. In June 2006, a regular production Z Series Maloo R8 broke the record for the world's fastest production performance pickup, at 271 km/h, (168 mph) beating the previous record holder, a Dodge Ram SRT-10 by 22 km/h.

The Maloo has been built over the following series:
 VG (1990–1991)
 VP (1991–1993)
 VR (1993–1995)
 VS (1995–2000)
 VU (2000–2002)
 VY (2002–2004)
 VZ (2004–2007)
 VE (2007–2013)
 VF (2013–2017)

The most powerful and developed version was the Gen-F 430 kW GTS Maloo, which was launched in November 2014. It featured GTS sedan mechanicals except for the Magnetic Ride Control suspension setup that, due to limited development opportunities, HSV left exclusively for the GTS sedan, Senator Signature and Grange. This Maloo was originally limited to 165 units, later increased to 250 plus 10 for export to New Zealand.

 Senator
The HSV/Opel Senator is a full size luxury sports sedan that was first introduced in 1992. It was based on the Holden Berlina and Calais twins. From 1997, HSV offered a wagon variant (based solely on the Berlina, since the Calais was never built in that body shape) and a higher specification model known as the "Senator Signature". The Senator has been built over the following series:
 VP (1992–1993)
 VR (1993–1995)
 VS (1995–1997)
 VT (1997–2000)
 VX (2000–2002)
 VY (2002–2004)
 VZ (2004–2006)
 VE (2006–2013)
 VF (2013–2017)

 SV88
The HSV SV88 was the first car to bear the HSV badge and was designed to compete against HDT's luxury performance Director model car. The SV88 was launched in 1988 and based on the VL Series luxury Calais.

 W427
The HSV W427 was a limited edition flagship based on the E Series, which was released to celebrate the company's 20th anniversary in 2008. It was also a car produced to address the public disappointment caused by HSV canning its ambitious HRT 427 project previewed in 2002.

Holden-based models by series

VL 
The Holden VL Commodore SS Group A SV was the first car produced by HSV. Developed under contract to Holden, it was released in March 1988. Best known for the polarising body kit and bluish-silver colour, the VL Group A SS was also the first model to feature a fuel-injected version of the Holden V8, with the first electronic fuel injection (EFI) VN Holden Commodore V8s not released until August 1988. The SV88 model was based on the VL Holden Calais and used a carburetored version of the V8 producing .

The range of vehicles for this series included (in chronological order):
 Commodore SS Group A SV, badged and sold as a Holden for racing homologation purposes
 SV88
 SV F20

VN/VG/VQ 

A number of models based on the VN Holden Commodore were developed by HSV, the most potent of which was the Commodore SS Group A SV built for Holden's touring car homologation requirements. Upgrades were also made to the suspension, tyres and brakes. Although a total production of 500 cars was original planned for racing homologation reasons, only 302 were ultimately produced in non-sequential order meaning that build number 450 may exist while build number 100 may not. The VN Group A SS was the last Holden built as a homologation racing special.

Other models used either  or  versions of the same V8 except the SV3800, which had a  3.8-litre V6. In 1990, the first HSV Maloo was released, based on the VG series Holden Ute of the time. The lighter Ute body provided a performance edge over the other HSV sedan counterparts. Models based on the long-wheelbase Holden VQ Caprice were released soon after. The SV90 and SV93 were treated with reworked suspension, wider front track and the  V8. The Statesman 5000i (in both series I and II form) featured .

The VN series also spawned HSV V6-engined regional models, which are less known and widely based on Holden Commodore models with HSV add-ons.

The range of vehicles for this series included (in alphabetical order):
 Challenger (special V6 built for Canberra dealers)
 Clubsport
 DMG90 (special V6 build for Queensland dealers)
 GTS V6 (New Zealand export)
 LS (V6 utility)
 Maloo (V8 utility)
 Statesman 5000i
 Statesman 5000i
 Statesman SV90
 Statesman SV93
 SV LE (sedan and wagon)
 SV89 (based on Berlina)
 SV3800
 SV5000
 SV T-30
 8-Plus
and
 the Holden Commodore SS Group A SV, again badged and sold as a Holden for racing homologation purposes.

VP 
With the release of the VP series, HSV began introducing independent rear suspension (IRS) to its models as well as introducing new model names, Senator and GTS. While the entry-level Clubsport and luxury Senator were equipped with the  V8, the high-performance GTS came standard with the  version and HSV's premium brake package. A limited-slip differential was standard across the range.
 Clubsport
 Clubsport 5000i
 Sport Wagon.
 GTS
 Maloo
 Senator
 Senator 5000i
 SV91
 Nitron
 Formula
 HSV+6.

VR/VS 

Following the appointment of award-winning designer Ian Callum as design chief for TWR, VR series HSV models benefited from a more cohesive and stylish body design. Upgrades were made to the 5.0 litre V8 to yield , while the GTS included a 5.7-litre stroked version producing 292 PS (215 kW) (also available as an option on the Senator) from May 1994 onwards. The VS series of 1995 introduced mild styling tweaks and a new three-spoke alloy wheel design. A value-oriented Manta was established as the base HSV model to broaden appeal. In 1996, a limited edition flagship GTS-R was created which came standard with the 5.7-litre V8, Tremec T56 six-speed transmission and "Hydratrak" limited slip differential (LSD) package. Available only in a polarising bright yellow colour (known as "XU-3 Yellah") with carbon fibre inserts and large rear wing, the GTS-R engine could be blueprinted for more power. In total, 85 GTS-Rs were produced (10 exported to New Zealand). The VS series II of 1996 introduced HSV's "Integrated Security System" (ISS) as standard, which featured an immobiliser and different electronics configuration for each car produced in an effort to deter theft. In 1996, a new Statesman-based model known as the Grange replaced previous HSV Statesman models.

 Clubsport (wagon available only in the VR Series)
 GTS
 Maloo
 Manta (VS only)
 Senator
 Statesman
 Grange (from the VS Series III of 1996).

VT 

This series was based on the all-new Holden VT Commodore range released in August 1997. It was the last series to be powered by Australian-made  5.0 litre V8 (cast iron block) and the  5.7-litre stroker in the GTS. A Senator Signature wagon was introduced and was mechanically identical to the sedan counterpart. The VS ute bodyshell was retained for the Maloo. There were only 180 Manta units produced, after which this model was dropped from production due to its close competition with the donor Commodore SS model.

HSV's VT range included:
 Manta (entry-level)
 Clubsport
 GTS (top performance model)
 Senator Signature (entry luxury model based on Calais)
 Senator Signature wagon
 Grange (top luxury model based on Caprice)
 Maloo (VS series based utility)
 SV99 (limited to only 99 vehicles, all produced between 1999 and 2000)

The range also comprised the XU8, which was built in limited numbers to carry last-ever Australian-made V8 engine.

The VT Series II represented a major update for HSV through the introduction of the new  5.7 litre GENIII LS1 V8, which saw Wheels magazine name the GTS as the fastest Holden ever at the time. The Manta and Senator Signature wagon were both dropped from the line-up due to poor sale performance. The flagship GTS presented many unique features such as a Callaway tuned  version of the LS1, a 3.91 final drive ratio and the addition of toe-control links to its IRS design. The recent release of the new WH series Caprice in 2001 allowed the Grange to gain its new look. This series also saw the introduction of a supercharged V6 model named the XU6, which ultimately did not prove successful and was described as being agricultural against new competitors such as the Magna VR-X, which was rated a superior product in a direct comparison. For the first time, a more performance-oriented Clubsport was launched, known as the Clubsport R8. It came standard with HSV's "Performance" suspension and braking package, which were offered as optional extras on the Clubsport. Again, the Maloo remained available using the VS ute body shell.

HSV's VT Series II range included:
 XU6 (V6 supercharged entry-level)
 Clubsport
 Clubsport R8 (new performance model)
 GTS
 Senator Signature
 Grange
 Maloo.

VX/VU 

Acting on feedback from owners, HSV strove to differentiate its range of vehicles from the standard Holden offerings. To achieve this, HSV introduced more distinguishing bodykit and interior designs. The introduction of the new VU Holden Ute allowed HSV to produce an all-new Maloo variant. A limited edition Senator 300 model also became available, equipped with the  V8 and suspension modifications from the GTS.

The range included:
 XU6
 Clubsport
 Clubsport R8
 Senator Signature
 Senator 300 (top performance luxury model)
 Grange
 GTS
 Maloo (new utility bodyshell).
The VX range saw HSV offer its first Coupé models based on the new V2 series, in GTO and GTS spec. The latter replaced the GTS sedan but was powered by a less powerful  engine. A Maloo R8 model was added with similar upgraded specification to the Clubsport R8. This series saw the addition of the XU6-Maloo, which was essentially a utility version of the XU6 sedan. This model was shortly discontinued due to a lack of demand. The special edition SV300 was introduced to replace the Senator 300. Toe-control links for the rear suspension was now fitted across the range in line with the Holden VX series update, for improved handling. The VXII update also brought with it the addition of Microdots across the range in order to reduce theft, a feature HSV refers to as HSV DNA.

The range now included:
 XU6
 Clubsport
 Clubsport R8
 Senator Signature
 SV300
 Grange
 Coupé GTO
 Coupé GTS
 Maloo
 Maloo R8
 XU6-Maloo (entry level utility)

Y Series 

Coinciding with the release of the VY Commodore, HSV produced the Y Series models adopting an even more distinguishing design and an alphabetical designation to further distance itself from donor Holden. While the GTS sedan returned (with a recalibrated ECU increasing power to ), the XU6 was discontinued due to a lack of demand attributed to a perceived lack of extra power relative to Holden's supercharged V6 sedans. The twin kidney grille design first introduced on the VR series Commodore became HSV's new signature grille. Finally, the Senator range was split into entry-level Senator and high-end luxury Senator Signature models.

The range included:
 Clubsport
 Clubsport R8
 GTS
 Senator
 Senator Signature
 Grange
 Coupé GTO
 Coupé GTS
 Maloo
 Maloo R8
 Avalanche (AWD performance wagon)

Y II Series
Rumors followed that a new engine was due for release, with the development of GM's new LS2 nearly complete. This power upgrade closed the performance gap between HSV's mainstream models and the  flagship GTS, which prompted speculation that the GTS was set for a power increase as well. An updated WK Statesman/Caprice from Holden also formed the basis for the new Grange. The GTO Coupé returned, and the forays of parent company Holden into AWD saw the introduction of the Avalanche (based on the Holden Adventra), the XUV (based on the Holden Crewman), and the Coupé4 (based on the Holden Monaro). The latter was particularly significant, as it was the first time that Holden's AWD system had been used in such a low-riding application. These new additions to the range made the Y Series II the biggest HSV range in history, with 16 variants.

The range included:
 Clubsport
 Clubsport R8
 Clubsport SE
 GTS
 Senator
 Senator Signature
 Grange
 Coupé GTO
 Coupé GTS
 Coupé4 (AWD)
 Maloo
 Maloo R8
 Avalanche
 Avalanche XUV (AWD performance utility)

Z Series 

This series of HSVs (released in October 2004) were known as the "Z" Series, reflecting the fact they were based on the VZ-series of the donor Holden Commodore. This saw the introduction, across the range, of the new GM LS2 V8, which generated 297 kW (400 hp). The AWD models retained the less powerful LS1. The lack of a GTS model in this series was attributable to the negligible power difference between the new LS2 models and a potential  GTS, sparking rumors that the new LS7 V8 was going to be used in the next series. In lieu of the GTS, HSV released the SV6000, which was based on the Clubsport and limited to 50 units. A new WL Statesman/Caprice model also resulted in an upgraded Grange.

The Z-series was the first range with which HSV reached the Middle East with the one-make racing ClubSport R sedans, and it was the last series to be based on the 1997–2006 VT Commodore, which adopted the V-body.

On 25 May 2006, a standard 2006 HSV Maloo R8 driven by Mark Skaife was clocked at an averaged speed of 271.44 km/h (168.7 mph) in the Woomera, South Australia. The speed was recognised by the Guinness World Records representative, Chris Sheedy, as the Fastest Production Pickup Truck recorded. The speed improved over the previous record held by a Dodge Ram SRT-10 at 248.784 km/h (154.587 mph).

A revised range was launched in January 2006, and is designated as the Z Series MY06 (in lieu of the more traditional "Series II" moniker).

The limited edition Signature Coupe was HSV's farewell to the Monaro/GTO as the last two door coupe manufactured in Australia.

The range included:
 Clubsport
 Clubsport R (one-make racing series)
 Clubsport R8
 Clubsport R8 Holden Racing Team (limited edition)
 Clubsport R8 Toll HSV Dealer Team (limited edition)
 SV6000 (limited edition)
 Grange
 Senator
 Senator Skaife Signature (limited edition)
 Coupé GTO
 Coupé4 AWD
 Coupé GTO LE
 Coupé Signature (limited edition)
 Maloo
 Maloo R8
 Maloo R8 15th Anniversary (limited edition)
 Avalanche
 Avalanche XUV
Crewman ss thunder (gen4 6.0litre)

In addition, in July 2005, HSV released upgraded manual-only Clubsport, Clubsport R8 and Coupé GTO fitted with optional 2-Stage "Dealer Team Spec" performance packages.

E Series 

An all-new Holden Commodore chassis, known as the VE was unveiled in July 2006. Following this, a new range of "E" Series HSV models were released in August 2006.

Extensive modifications to the base VE Commodore sheetmetal and interior were introduced, most notably the unique LED taillights and distinctive side vents. The new GM 6L80-E 6 speed automatic transmission from the VE Commodore is offered, and Electronic Stability Control is standard on all models.

The GTS, Senator Signature and Grange additionally feature switchable Magnetic Ride Control to improve ride and handling. As such, the E Series represents HSV's most expensive model developments in its history, with the MRC suspension system alone costing A$4.5 million. In October, a new Grange model based on the Holden WM Caprice was released featuring the same V8 and MRC suspension as the Senator Signature and GTS, albeit with its own unique settings.

HSV also released a HSV Senator Signature SV08 which is released in a limited run of 20 manual and 30 automatic units. This model featured lower paint-outs, sill plates and extra chrome accents on the side mirrors and door handles. It was powered by a V8 engine developing 317 kW mated to a new Tremec TR-6060 gearbox and had 20-inch "Pentagon" wheels, Magnetic Ride Control suspension system with Sport mode and Park Assist system.

In August 2008, HSV launched its new flagship model, the W427. This car is based on the GTS, but carries a 7.0 L LS7 V8 engine along with larger brakes, strengthened gearbox, revised suspension and unique MRC settings. It is still the most expensive, at $155 500.

On 28 March 2008, HSV announced that the LS3 6.2-litre engine would be fitted to all E-Series models (with the exception of the LS7 W427) from April 2008.
12 May 2008 saw the announcement of a new HSV E Series model; the HSV "Tourer". This new model, based on the VE Holden Sportwagon was later officially released in September 2008.

The range included:
 Clubsport R8
 Clubsport R8 20th Anniversary Edition (limited edition)
 Clubsport R8 Tourer
 Clubsport GXP (limited edition)
 GTS
 W427
 Senator Signature
 Senator SV08 (limited edition)
 Grange
 Maloo R8
 Maloo GXP (limited edition)

E Series 2

The HSV E Series 2 range was released late 2009 and was the most major update since the release of E Series HSV's. Prices started at $65,990 for the Clubsport R8.
The range received many cosmetic changes with new front and rear bumpers, twin-nostriled bonnet (from the Pontiac G8) and a new range of wheel designs. The Series 2 has a very distinctive look set of daytime running lights standard across the E2 range. On 9 September 2010, HSV released the E Series 3.

The new engines in the range are the  6.2-litre LS3 V8 used exclusively by the HSV GTS, with the rest of the E2 range being powered by an LS3 in  trim. The new engines have also improved fuel economy by 4.2 per cent on the LS3 V8.
New is the intelligent launch controls, Competition mode ESC and Extended cruise control systems which are all standard for E2 models excluding intelligent launch control which is only available with a manual transmission.

E Series 3

This last version of the E Series was released on 21 September 2010.

Gen-F 

The Gen-F series, which is based on the VF Commodore series went on sale in August 2013. Its retail price was considerably higher than the equivalent E Series 3 models, costing over $90,000.

The range included:
 Clubsport R8
 Clubsport R8 SV Black (350 made)
 Clubsport R8 Tourer
 Clubsport R8 25th Anniversary (limited edition)
 Clubsport R8 LSA
 Clubsport R8 Track Edition
 Grange
 GTS
 GTSR
 GTSR W1
 GTS Maloo
 GTSR Maloo
 GTSR W1 Maloo (Only 5 made, sold to VIP)
 Maloo
 Maloo R8
 Maloo R8 LSA
 Maloo R8 LSA 30th Anniversary (limited edition)
 Maloo R8 SV Black
 Senator Signature
 Senator SV (limited edition)

Other models 
Although the majority of HSV models are based on variants of the Holden Commodore, HSV has also produced a few cars based on other models part of the Holden lineup.

Astra SV1800 

The HSV Astra SV1800 was released in 1988, and was based on the LD-series Holden Astra of the time (which was itself based on the Nissan Pulsar N13 series).

It shared the same 1.8L engine as the standard Astra, but was released with extractors, sports exhaust and an aerodynamic sports body kit (adopted from the Walkinshaw, which is why the SV1800 was nicknamed the Baby Walky) however, only 65 were made in both sedan and hatchback form.

VXR Turbo 

The HSV VXR Turbo is a rebadged Vauxhall Astra which was imported from Belgium between 2006 and 2009. Additionally it is equipped with the adaptive IDS (Interactive Driving System) suspension system along with ESC, traction control system, ABS and BA. The VXR Turbo was marketed without the Astra name.

Other than the original HSV VXR, a "Nürburgring" special edition was also launched in July 2008.

Jackaroo 

This mid-size SUV was released in July 1993 and was a cosmetic upgrade of the Holden Jackaroo, which was itself the Australian adaptation of the second generation Isuzu Trooper. It was powered by the same 130 kW (177 hp) 3.2L SOHC V6 petrol engine as the donor Holden model.

SportsCat
The SportsCat is based on the Holden Colorado.

Colorado V8 
Plans for a high power version of the Holden Colorado using the LT1 engine and a 10-speed transmission was cancelled in 2020 with the closure of HSV and Holden. Two prototypes were built with powertrains taken from crash-tested Chevrolet Camaros, one based on a HSV SportsCat, and the other based on a North American Chevrolet Colorado to be aimed at that market. It was the final project worked on by HSV, and would have received a new name, ThunderCat being one of the considered options.

Models by year 
The following is a chronological list of all HSV models (and build numbers, where available) since 1988, including limited editions and dealer specials.

1988
 Commodore SS Group A SV (500 VL-series built + 250 extra; produced for, badged and sold, Holden for racing homologation purposes; all in Panorama Silver paint; March to November 1988)
 SV88 (150 VL-series built; based on Calais; May to July 1988)
 SV F20 ("Final 20" VL-series vehicles; 2 built + 2 replicas; based on Commodore; July to August 1988)
 Astra SV1800 (65 LD-series built; 35 hatchbacks and 30 sedans; September 1988 to March 1989)
 SV3800 (491 VN-series built; October 1988 to May 1990)

1989
 SV89 (200 VN-series built; based on Berlina; March to July 1989)
 SV6 (64 VN-series built; April 1989 to May 1991)
 SV LE (110 sedan and 80 wagons VN-series built; August 1989 to September 1989 and to January 1990, respectively)
 LE (100 VN-series built; October 1989 to January 1990)
 SV5000 (359 VN-series built with 10 exported to New Zealand; September 1989 to September 1991)

1990
 8 Plus (80 VN-series built; 25 manual and 55 automatic; March 1990)
 GTS V6 (510 VN-series built for New Zealand; in Vivid White or GTS Blue metallic equivalent to Alpine White or Imperial Blue; March 1990)
 DMG90 (50 VN-series built for the Dealer Motor Group in Queensland; based on Commodore S-pack V6 and SV89 bodykit; April 1990 Brisbane Motorshow)
 Challenger (50 VN-built special for Canberra market; painted in Alpine White; June 1990 to June 1991)
 SV T-30 (30 VN-series built for "Top 30" selling dealers only; based on Commodore SS and SV89 bodykit; June 1990)
 ClubSport (410 VN-series built; 60 in Asteroid Silver paint; June 1990 to August 1991)
 Statesman SV90 (135 VQ-series built; June 1990 to September 1991)
 Maloo (135 VG-series built; in Maranello Red or Alpine White paint; October 1990 to April 1993)
 Commodore SS Group A SV (302 VN-series built; produced for, badged and sold, Holden for racing homologation purposes; all in Durif red paint except 2 in black; November 1990 to March 1991)

1991
 Plus 6 (100 VN-series built, of which 60 automatic; March to August 1991)
 SV91 (1 VN-series prototype in April 1991)
 Statesman 5000i (50 VQ-series built; May 1991 to April 1992)
 SV T-30 (10 VN Series II built for "Top" selling dealers only; June to July 1991)
 LS (300 VN-series all V6 sedans except at least one V8 for Australia + 130 sedans and 20 wagons to New Zealand; based on Commodore Executive; July 1991)
 LS utility (54 VG and VP-series V6 built; September 1991 to June 1993)
 ClubSport (387 VP-series built + 65 "5th Anniversary"; October 1991 to June 1993)
 Sport Wagon (43 VP-series + 5 "5th Anniversary" built; October 1991 to June 1993)

 SV91 ( 103 VP-series built; October 1991 to June 1992)

1992
 +Six (82 VP-series built; February to June 1992)
 Maloo (34 VP-series + 15 "5th Anniversary" built)
 Senator (201 VP-series built; April 1992 to September 1993)
 Senator 5000i (136 VP-series; replacing the SV5000; April 1992 to September 1993)
 Statesman 5000i Series II (81 VQ Series II + 9 "5th Anniversary" built; April 1992 to September 1993)
 Nitron (50 VP-series built; July to August 1992)
 GTS (130 VP-series built; September 1992 to December 1992)
 Statesman SV93 (46 VQ Series II + 5 "5th Anniversary" built; September 1992 to March 1993)
 GTS V6 (VP-series for New Zealand; November 1992)

1993
 +Six (58 VP Series II built; March 1993)
 Formula (67 VP Series II built; May to June 1993)
 ClubSport 5000i (50 VP Series II built + 15 to New Zealand; May to June 1993)
 Jackaroo (79 UBS-series built; cosmetic upgrade to the Holden namesake; June 1993)
 ClubSport (1116 VR-series built; July 1993 to March 1995 + 1 additional sedan in July 1995)
 ClubSport wagon (77 VR-series built; July 1993 to March 1995)
 Senator and Senator 5000i (VP Series II, launched in February 1993; 15 and 30 "15th Anniversary" respective models launched in June 1993)
 Senator 185i (632 VR-series built; July 1993 to March 1995) 
 Maloo (156 VR-series built; August 1993 to February 1995)

1994
 Senator 215i (223 VR-series built; May 1994 to March 1995)
 GTS (277 VR-series built; May 1994 to March 1995)
 Statesman 185i and 215i (48 VR-series built; September 1994 to March 1995)
 Caprice 215i (3 or 7 "215i" VR-series built; November 1994 to December 1996)

1995
 Maloo (97 VS-series built to December 1995; 173 total between April 1995 and June 1996)
 Manta sedan and wagon (195 VS-series sedans built to December 1995; 201 manual and 28 automatic total between April 1995 to June 1996)
 ClubSport (593 VS-series built to December 1995; 987 total between April 1995 and June 1996)
 Senator 185i (403 VS-series built; April 1995 to June 1996)
 Senator 215i (200 VS-series built, as 71 manual and 129 automatic; April 1995 to June 1996)
 GTS (158 VS-series built to December 1995; 83 automatic and 138 manual between April 1995 and June 1996)
 Statesman 185i (47 VS-series built; April 1995 to September 1996)
 Statesman 215i (35 VS-series built; April 1995 to September 1996)
 Caprice 215i (12 VS-series built; April 1995 to September 1996)

1996
 GTS-R "215i" (85 VS Series II built; 1 media car and 9 to New Zealand; option of standard or "Blueprint" engine; all in XU-3 Yellah paint)
 Maloo (280 VS Series II built; June 1996 to August 1997)
 Manta sedan and wagon (75 and 20 VS Series II built, respectively; June 1996 to September 1997)
 ClubSport (1217 VS Series II built; June 1996 to August 1997)
 Senator 185i (315 VS Series II built as automatics; June 1996 to August 1997)
 Senator 215i (187 VS Series II built, as 63 manual and 114 automatic; June 1996 to August 1997)
 GTS (154 VS Series II built, as 103 manual and 51 automatic; June 1996 to August 1997)
 Grange 185i (27 VS Series II built; based on Statesman; September 1996 to April 1999)
 Grange 215i (19 VS Series II built; based on Statesman; September 1996 to April 1999)
 Caprice 215i (6 VS Series II built; September 1996 to December 1996)

1997
 Maloo (388 "VS Series II at VT" built; 185i engine; September 1997 to December 1998)
 Manta (180 VT-series built; based on Commodore SS with 195i engine; September 1997 to November 1998)
 Clubsport (1505 VT-series built, as 948 automatic and 557 manual; September 1997 to May 1999)
 Senator Signature 195i (323 VT-series built; based on Calais fittings; September 1997 to June 1999)
 Senator Signature 195i wagon (27 VT-series built; based on automatic Berlina wagon with Calais fittings; September 1997 to June 1999)
 Senator Signature 220i (208 VT-series built; September 1997 to June 1999)
 GTS (399 VT-series built; 263 manual and 136 automatic; September 1997 to September 1999)

1998
 Maloo "10th Anniversary" (30 "VS Series II at VT" built; 185i engine; March to August 1998)
 Maloo (VS Series III; 185i engine; launched in May 1988)
 XU6 180i (321 VT-series built; V6 supercharged engine with automatic only; October 1998 to September 1999)
 XU6 180i "10th Anniversary" (10 VT-series built; V6 supercharged engine with automatic only; February 1998 to June 1998)
 Clubsport "10th Anniversary" (174 VT-series built, as 104 automatic and 70 manual; August 1998 to October 1998)
 Senator Signature 220i "10th Anniversary" (10 VT-series built; March 1998 to June 1998)
 XU8 (141 VT-series built; 195i final Australian-made V8 engine; June 1999)
 Grange 185i and 215i (VS Series III, launched in June 1998)

1999
 XU6 (320 VT Series II built; supercharged engine and automatic only; July 1999 to September 2000)
 Clubsport (1445 VT Series II built, as 1255 automatic and 190 manual; July 1999 to October 2000)
 Clubsport R8 (193 VT Series II built, as 123 automatic and 70 manual; July 1999 to October 2000)
 Senator V6 supercharged (6 VT Series II built; automatic only; July 1999 to October 2000)
 Senator 250i (26 VT Series II built, as 1 manual and 25 automatic; July 1999 to October 2000)
 Senator Signature 250i sedan and wagon (268 VT Series II built, as 29 manual and 239 automatic sedans and 8 wagons; July 1999 to October 2000)
 SV99 (99 VT Series II built; July 1999 to April 2000)
 Grange V6 supercharged (total 6 WH-series built; automatic only; launched in June 1999 and produced until November 2000)
 Grange 250i (total 548 WH-series; V6 supercharged; launched in June 1999 and produced until November 2000)
 Maloo (VS Series III; 195i engine)

2000
 GTS 300i (117 VT Series II built; 17 exported, 73 in Phantom Black and 27 in Sting Red paint; revised multi-link rear suspension; April 2000 to September 2000)
 Clubsport "Hackett" special edition (200 VT Series II built; August 2000 to September 2000)
 XU6 180i (171 VX-series built; supercharged engine and automatic only; September 2000 to September 2001)
 Clubsport (948 VX-series built, as 533 automatic and 415 manual; September 2000 to September 2001)
 Clubsport R8 (1077 VX-series built, as 597 automatic and 480 manual; September 2000 to September 2001)
 Senator Signature 255i (233 VX-series built, as 208 automatic and 23 manual and 2 wagons; September 2000 to September 2001)
 GTS (287 VX-series built with manual transmission; November 2000 to September 2001)

2001
 Maloo (301 VU-series built, as 139 automatic and 162 manual; 483 VU Series II R8 built, as 222 automatic and 261 manual; R8 option introduced; launched in March 2001 and September 2001, respectively)
 Senator 300i (30 VX-series built + 3 to New Zealand; Callaway C4B engine; May 2001 to June 2001)
 SV300 (134 VX Series II built; replacing Senator 300; September to December 2001)
 XU6 180i (117 VX Series II built; supercharged engine and automatic only; October 2001 to October 2002). Build numbers extend to 124.
 Clubsport (1099 VX Series II built, as 574 automatic and 525 manual; October 2001 to October 2002)
 Clubsport R8 (1077 VX Series II built, as 422 automatic and 355 manual; October 2001 to October 2002)
 Senator Signature 255i (97 VX Series II built, as 85 automatic and 12 manual; October 2001 to October 2002)
 Grange 255i (150 WH Series II built; launched in September 2001)
 Coupé GTO and GTS (based on V2-series Monaro; launched in December 2001)

2002
 Clubsport "15th Anniversary" (105 VX Series II built, with build numbers 1 to 105; mostly in Delft Blue paint available on sedans for the first time and small numbers in Phantom Black and Sting Red; June 2002)
 Clubsport R8 "15th Anniversary" (45 VX Series II built, with build numbers 1 to 45; June 2002)
 Maloo R8 "15th Anniversary" (25 VU Series II built + 5 to New Zealand, with Australian build numbers 1 to 25; June 2002)
 Clubsport and Clubsport R8 (Y-series; launched in October 2002)
 GTS (Y-series; launched in October 2002)
 Senator and Senator Signature (Y-series; launched in October 2002)
 Maloo and Maloo R8 (Y-series; launched in October 2002)

2003
 Coupé GTO and GTS (based on V2 Series II; launched in March 2003; exported as the Vauxhall Monaro VXR)
 Clubsport and Clubsport R8 (Y Series II; launched in September 2003)
 GTS (Y Series II; launched in September 2003)
 Senator and Senator Signature (Y Series II; launched in September 2003)
 Grange (WK-series; launched in September 2003)
 Coupé GTO LE (100 units based on V2 Series III; in Turbine Grey or Quicksilver paints; launched in September 2003)
 Maloo and Maloo R8 (Y Series II; September 2003 to July 2004)
 Avalanche (Y Series II wagon; first HSV to adopt AWD; launched in December 2003)

2004
 Coupé GTO and GTS (based on V2 Series III; launched in February 2004)
 Coupé4 (AWD adaptation of V2 Series III and Z-series; in Sting Red, Phantom Black or Quicksilver; launched in July and October 2004, respectively)
 Clubsport SE (Y-series II; July 2004)
 Clubsport and Clubsport R8 (Z-series; launched in October 2004)
 Senator (Y Series II; launched in October 2004)
 Grange (WL-series; launched in October 2004)
 Coupé GTO (based on Z-series; launched in October 2004; exported as the Vauxhall Monaro VXR)
 Avalanche (Z-series AWD wagon; produced from October 2004)
 Avalanche XUV ("X-Treme Utility Vehicle" AWD dual-cab ute; Y-series II and Z-series, produced from March 2004 and from October 2004 to March 2005, respectively)
 Maloo and Maloo R8 (Z-series; launched in October 2004)

2005
 SV6000 (planned 50+ Z-series build; 30 in Devil Yellow paint and remainder in Phantom Black; March 2005)
 Clubsport and Clubsport R8 "Dealer Team Spec" (a Stage 1 package for the Z-series including upgrade tyre and wheel package, lighter overall weight and, with the optional Stage 2, other upgrades including enhanced driver interface, adjustable suspension and tyre pressure monitors; manual only; July 2005)
 Coupé GTO "Dealer Team Spec" (as above)
 Maloo R8 "15th Anniversary" (50 Z-series built; all in Devil Yellow paint to celebrate Maloo anniversary; August 2005)

2006
 Clubsport R (Z-series for one-make racing series)
 Clubsport R8 "Holden Racing Team" (50 Z Series MY06 built; in Sting Red paint and white stripes and racing decals; built in January and launched in March 2006)
 Clubsport R8 "Toll HSV Dealer Team" (50 Z Series MY06 built; in Phantom Black paint and orange accents; built in January and launched in March 2006)
 Senator Signature "Mark Skaife" (50 Z Series MY06 built; automatic only; in Phantom Black paint and chrome shadow wheels; built in January and launched in March 2006)
 Clubsport and Clubsport R8 (Z Series MY06 and E-series; launched in February 2006 and August 2006, respectively; R8 exported as the Chevrolet Special Vehicles CR8 and Vauxhall VXR8 from E-series)
 GTS (E-series; August 2006)
 Coupé GTO LE (Z-series; 50 units in black, 25 in yellow and 25 in red built; April 2006)
 Coupé Signature (70 Z-series built, all in Sting Red paint with gloss black accents, AP racing brakes & Sunroof; August 2006)
 Maloo and Maloo R8 (Z Series MY06; launched in July 2006)
 VXR (AH-series; first Vauxhall variant; launched in October 2006)

2007
 Clubsport "20th Anniversary" (100 E-series built; all in Sandstorm paint)

 Grange (WM-series; launched in May 2007)
 Maloo R8 (E-series; launched in October 2007)
2008
 W427 (137 E-series built)
 Clubsport R8 "Murph Special Edition" (41 E-series built for New Zealand)
 Maloo R8 "Murph Special Edition" (10 utes for New Zealand only)
 Senator SV08 (50 E-series built)
 VXR Nurburgring Edition (AH-series; launched in July 2008)

2009
 Clubsport R8 (E Series II; launched in September 2009)
 GTS (E Series II, launched in September 2009)
 Senator Limited Edition (89 E-series built; 59 automatic and 30 manual entry-level Senator)
 Grange (WM Series II; launched in September 2009)
 Maloo R8 (E series II; launched in September 2009)

2010
 Clubsport R8 "GXP" (400 E Series II build; 6 colours; March 2010)
 Clubsport "20th Anniversary" (E Series II; all in Millenium silver paint; June 2010)
 Clubsport R8 (E Series III, launched in September 2010)
 GTS (E Series III, launched in September 2010)
 Grange (WM Series III, launched in September 2010)
 Maloo "GXP" (E series II; launched in March 2010)
 Maloo and Maloo R8 (E series III; launched in September 2010)
 Maloo "20 Years of Maloo" R8 (100 E series III built; launched in September 2010)

2011
 Clubsport R8 SV Black Edition (100 E Series III built for Australia, with 15 for New Zealand; September 2011) 15 sedans (2 painted red) and 5 utes to New Zealand)
 Clubsport R8 Tourer SV Black Edition 25 E Series III built for Australia; September 2011)
 Maloo R8 SV Black Edition (100 E Series III built for Australia; September 2011)
 Clubsport R8 SV-R ("Response"; 4 yellow E-series III built for Queensland Police)

2012
 Clubsport and Clubsport R8 (E Series III "MY12.5" series, from August 2012)
 GTS "25th Anniversary" (140 E-Series III built; 125 for Australia and 15 for New Zealand)

2013
 Clubsport and Clubsport R8 sedan and Tourer (Gen-F series; optional "SV Enhanced" package; launched in May 2013; R8 exported as the Vauxhall VXR8)
 GTS (Gen-F series also exported as Vauxhall VXR8 GTS; launched in August 2013)
 Grange (Gen-F series, launched in May 2013)
 Maloo, Maloo R8 and Maloo R8 "SV Enhanced" (Gen-F, launched in May 2013)

2014
 Clubsport and Clubsport R8 sedan and Tourer (Gen-F series III "MY15" series with "SV Enhanced" package standard on R8, from November 2014)
 GTS (Gen-F "MY15" series, from November 2014)
 Maloo and Maloo R8 "SV Enhanced" (Gen-F series "MY15" series with "SV Enhanced" package standard on R8, from November 2014)
 GTS Maloo (250 Gen-F series built, with 240 for Australia and 10 for New Zealand; September 2014)
 Grange (Gen-F "MY15" series, from November 2014)

2015
 Senator SV (52 Gen-F "MY15" series built; 50 for Australia and 2 for New Zealand)
 Clubsport R8 "25th Anniversary" (108 Gen-F "MY15" series built; 100 for Australia and 8 for New Zealand; July 2015)

2016
 ClubSport R8 SV Black, 350 ClubSport R8's (plus 18 for New Zealand) and 100 Maloo, $62,990 for the Maloo R8 SV Black and $65,990 for the ClubSport R8 SV Black

2017
 Last Australian-made car to roll off a local assembly line. Last GTS-R W1 — the fastest, most powerful and the most expensive car ever built in Australia.

Production milestones 
In 2014, HSV reported the following production milestones:
 June 1991: 5,000th HSV built was a SV T-30
 April 1997: 20,000th HSV built was a Senator
 August 2003: 40,000th HSV built was a ClubSport
 July 2006: 50,000th HSV built was a ClubSport
 February 2013: 75,000th HSV built was a ClubSport
 September 2014: 80,000th HSV built was a ClubSport R8 in Phantom Black paint.

Exports 
HSV exported its range to New Zealand without any rebranding, as in the case of Singapore, where exports resumed in 2010 after a two-decade absence. From the 2000s, however, exports to the United Kingdom and Middle East, saw the cars rebadged Vauxhall and CSV, respectively.

Vauxhall 
 The Coupé GTO, in Y Series II and Z Series, was exported to the UK badged as the Vauxhall Monaro VXR. They were powered by a ) LS1 V8 engine and a  LS2 V8 engines, respectively.
 Between 2007 and 2013, the E Series of the Clubsport R8 was also exported to the UK badged as the Vauxhall VXR8. This was sold until 2017, when Holden stopped manufacturing in Australia.

Chevrolet Special Vehicles (CSV) 
 HSV first reached into the Middle Eastern market with a one-race series featuring stripped down ClubSport R (Z Series) sedans in Dubai.
 The Clubsport R8 (E Series) followed as a road legal car, rebadged as the Chevrolet Special Vehicles CR8 (its CSV badge not to be confused with the unrelated, but still Holden Commodore-based, Corsa Specialised Vehicles brand).

Concept cars 
HRT Maloo utility
Based on the VX HSV Maloo, it was fitted with a new bodykit featuring significantly flared wheel arches to accommodate wider track and 20-inch wheels. The roof was lowered and modifications made to the suspension to produce a "ground hugging" stance. The ute was powered by a LS6 V8 stroked to 6.2 litres (producing 350 kW (469 hp)) with exhaust exiting from the side.

HRT 427

Unveiled at the 2002 Sydney Motor Show, the HRT (Holden Racing Team) 427 was based on a modified Holden Monaro bodyshell and, among other things, it featured a  (7.0-Litre) V8 engine (adapted from the Corvette C5-R) – hence the name. Due to the high cost specifications, the business case for full production failed since Holden could not build the 427 in such limited quantities for the original asking price of A$215,000. In all, only two road and four racing versions were ever built.

GTS-R

This concept was unveiled at the 2004 Sydney Motor Show also based on the Monaro bodyshell. Similarities could be drawn with the HRT 427, however, this model was only intended for a one-make racing series and was powered by a modified 6.0-litre version of Chevrolet's LS2 V8 engine producing . This concept, too, never reached production.

Engines

GM 6.2-litre Supercharged V8 LSA 
 Power:  at 6000 rpm.
 Torque:  at 4200 rpm.
The supercharged 6.2L LSA is similar to the LS9 and debuted in the 2009 CTS-V. The LSA has been SAE certified at 556 bhp (415 kW) at 6100 rpm and 551 lb·ft (747 N·m) at 3800 rpm. GM labels it "the most powerful ever offered in Cadillac's nearly 106-year history". The LSA features a smaller 1.9L capacity supercharger rather than the 2.3 L variant of the LS9. Other differences include a slightly lower 9.0:1 compression ratio, single unit heat exchanger and cast pistons.
A 580 bhp (430 kW) and 556 lb·ft (754 N·m) version of the LSA engine is used in the 2012 Camaro ZL1. On 26 April 2013, HSV announced that this version of the LSA engine will also be used in the GEN-F GTS.

GM 7.0-litre V8 LS7 
 Power:  (W427)
 Torque:  (W427)
This engine was originally used in the sixth-generation Corvette Z06 that was then shipped over for usage in the W427. It made its first appearance in Australia in 2008. The W427 was designed and built to celebrate the 20th anniversary of HSV.

GM 6.2-litre V8 LS3 
 Power:  (E Series),  (E Series II GTS), 340 kW (462 PS, 456 hp) (GEN-F SV Enhanced models)
 Torque:  (E Series),  (GEN-F SV Enhanced models)
This engine debuted in the E Series. It is a GM built LS3 V8 customized for HSV's usage. The transition from LS2 to LS3 was primarily to meet impending Euro IV emissions requirements being introduced in Australia on 1 January 2009 and to compete against 2008's  FPV GT.

GM 6.0-litre V8 LS2 
 Power:  at 6000 rpm (Z series),  (E Series)
 Torque:  at 4400 rpm (Z series),  (E Series)
This engine debuted in the Z series. It is a GM built LS2 V8 customized for HSV's usage.
One of the main reasons that this engine was used is that the LS1 V8 does not meet ADR 79/01 (Euro III) emissions regulations. This new engine also has connections to the L76 6.0-litre used in the VZ and VE Holden Commodores.

GM 5.7-litre V8 LS1 
 Power:  (VTII),  (VX),  (Y series),  (AWD models),  (YII series)
 Torque:  (VTII),  (VX), (Y series),  (YII series)
This motor started its debut in the VTII series of HSV sedans. It produced  of power –  more than HSV's previous "Stroker" 5.7 V8 used in the VT. It was a slightly de-tuned version, with  less than when it was in the two-door sports body of the Corvette. Continuous modifications were made to the LS1 engine throughout its lifetime, reaching  in the YII series, just  under the  GTS. The LS1 was phased out for the new 6.0-litre LS2 in the Z Series. However, it was still used in the AWD models of the Z series.

GM 5.7-litre V8 LS1 (C4B) 
 Power:  at 6000 rpm
 Torque:  at 4800 rpm A modified version of the LS1 enhanced by Callaway Cars Incorporated, this engine was used on the VTII, VX and Y series of GTS models as well as the SV300. Differences from the LS1 included ported cylinder heads, larger throttle body, revised camshaft, remapped ECU, titanium valve spring retainers, upgraded valve springs and valves. The compression ratio was also lowered slightly to 9.95:1 and the engine ran MAFless. In HSV models, this engine was used with a higher than standard 3.91:1 final drive ratio.

HSV 5.7-litre '350ci Harrop Stroker' V8 
 Power:  at 4800 rpm (VR-VS),  (VT)
 Torque:  at 3600 rpm This motor had its debut in the VR series of HSV sedans. It was a bored and stroked version of the Holden 304ci 5.0 litre and was originally available on the VR Senator and GTS 215i. A Tremec T-56 six-speed manual gearbox option exclusive to this engine was introduced as the then current Borg-Warner T-5 5-speed could not reliably handle the prodigious amounts of torque it produced. The 215i engine was also available on the Grange long-wheelbase model. Its last appearance was in the VT GTS(Series 1). The LS1 replaced it in the VTII series.

Holden 5.0-litre V8 
 Power:  at 5200 rpm (VL), (VN SS)   (VN Group A SS),  (VP),  at 4800 rpm (VN-VP),  (VR-VS),  (VT)
 Torque:  at 4000 rpm(VL),  (VN Group A SS),  at 3600 rpm (VN-VP),  at 3600 rpm (VN-VS),  at 3600 rpm (VT)
This engine for HSV was available in 2 guises. The twin throttle bodied versions designed for racing use were available in the VL and VN Group A cars from 1988 and 1990 respectively. For the majority of HSV sedans using this capacity motor, the engines were modified versions of the standard EFI Holden V8. Note that there was also a VP equipped Clubsport 5000i that used the remaining 4 bolt main Group A blocks with SV5000 red motor ancillaries.
The LS1 replaced it in the VTII series.
 Additionally:
1.
2. The VL SS Group A SV Commodore was the first Holden V8 to feature Electronic Fuel Injection.

HSV 3.8-litre supercharged V6 
 Power:  at 5000 rpm
 Torque:  at 3200 rpm
Available on the VT and VX series HSV XU6. Also only two HSV VX Senators were ever produced with a V6 Supercharged motor. There were several limited VT HSV sedans and wagons with the L67. This engine is a modified version of Holden's supercharged V6 with upgraded air intake and exhaust to boost power from the standard . Due to the popularity and superior performance of Ford's standard I6 engine, let alone the turbocharged variant, this model was removed from the line-up after the VY series.

VXR 2.0-litre Ecotec-4 Turbo 
 Power:  at 5600 rpm
 Torque:  at 2400 rpm
This 4-cylinder engine is used in the HSV VXR, a model based on the Vauxhall Astra VXR/Opel Astra OPC.

V8 Supercars 
In 2005, HSV provided sponsorship for the V8 Supercar team formerly known as the Kmart Racing Team. The team adopted HSV Dealer Team as their new name. With Garth Tander and Rick Kelly driving the two cars, the newly renamed team struggled in its first few outings in 2005, they found form later in the season, and from round one led the 2006 Championship to victory. Rick Kelly won the 2006 series.. In 2007, Tander and Kelly won 17 races between them out of a possible 37, with Tander winning 15 of them and four round wins, winning the championship along the way. HSVDT also won their second Teams Championship in succession. The team was disbanded for the 2009 season. HSV's remaining sponsorship is with Walkinshaw Andretti United.

Rivals 
HSV's direct rival was Ford Australia through its various performance arms, namely Ford Tickford Experience (FTE) from 1999, and Ford Performance Vehicles (FPV) from 2002 to 2014, with their production of modified Ford Falcon-based cars. Another rival, albeit on a smaller scale, has been Corsa Specialised Vehicles (CSV – not to be confused with HSV's exports badged Chevrolet Special Vehicles in some markets) with its Commodore-based high performance cars that included the CSV GTS of 2007. This CSV beat the HSV W427 to the market by being the first Holden vehicle powered by a 7.0L LS7 V8 engine.

See also 
 List of HSV vehicles

References 

 
 Guinness World Record for Fastest Production Pickup Truck

External links 
 HSV Website
 The HSV Classic Programme
 Worldwide HSV Owners Forum

Automotive companies established in 1987
General Motors marques
 
Official motorsports and performance division of automakers
1987 establishments in Australia
2020 disestablishments in Australia